Kreutzer Sonata or Kreutzer's Sonata may refer to:

Music, literature and stage
Violin Sonata No. 9 (Beethoven), Ludwig van Beethoven's 1803 sonata Op. 47, dedicated to Rodolphe Kreutzer
Any of the sonatas composed by Rodolphe Kreutzer, the dedicatee of Beethoven's sonata
Any of the sonatas composed by Conradin Kreutzer
The Kreutzer Sonata, Leo Tolstoy's 1889 novella, taking its title from Beethoven's sonata
Di Kreytser sonata (The Kreutzer Sonata), a 1902 stage adaptation of Tolstoy's novel by Jacob Gordin
String Quartet No. 1 (Janáček), subtitled Kreutzer Sonata, Leoš Janáček's 1923 composition inspired by Tolstoy's novel

Film
The Kreutzer Sonata (1911 film), a Russian silent film directed by Pyotr Chardynin
The Kreutzer Sonata, a 1914 Russian film directed by Vladimir Gardin
The Kreutzer Sonata (1915 film), an American silent film directed by Herbert Brenon
The Kreutzer Sonata (1920 film), an Italian silent film directed by Umberto Fracchia
The Kreutzer Sonata (1922 film), a German silent film directed by Rolf Petersen
The Kreutzer Sonata (1927 film), a Czech silent film directed by Gustav Machatý
The Kreutzer Sonata (1937 film), a German film directed by Veit Harlan
La Sonate à Kreutzer, a 1956 French short film directed by Éric Rohmer
The Kreutzer Sonata (1987 film), a Soviet film directed by Mikhail Shveytser
The Kreutzer Sonata (2008 film), an American film by Bernard Rose

See also
Kreutzer (disambiguation)